Stefano Tomassetti (born 5 September 1980) is an Italian darts player who plays in Professional Darts Corporation events.

A cook by trade, in 2019, he will make his television debut in the 2019 PDC World Cup of Darts, partnering Andrea Micheletti.He has been Italian champion several times, both single and double and in teams.  In 2019 he won his first international title, the Akropolis open in Athens, the first time for an Italian.  He finished third at the Italian Grand Master in Pieve di Cento in 2016 after an epic semifinal against Martin Adams where he lost at the decider 5–4.

References

External links

1980 births
Living people
Italian darts players
Professional Darts Corporation associate players
PDC World Cup of Darts Italian team